Dario Campagna (born 30 January 1988 in Turin) is an Italian professional footballer who is currently unattached.

Club career

Juventus
Campagna began his footballing career within the youth ranks of Serie A powerhouse, Juventus F.C. He graduated from the Primavera Squadra in 2008. He did earn a few first team call-ups throughout the 2006–07 season, however, Campagna did not appear for the Juventus first team prior to his official transfer to Hellas Verona F.C. in July 2008.

Hellas Verona
On 5 July 2008, he joined Lega Pro Prima Divisione side, Hellas Verona. In his first season with the club, Campagna made 20 league appearances, however, in the following three seasons, he featured less sparingly, and in January 2012, Hellas Verona opted to loan the player out to the Lega Pro Prima Divisione with Piacenza Calcio. During his loan spell with Piacenza, Campagna made 8 league appearances, and returned to Verona on 30 June 2012, ahead of the 2012–13 Serie B campaign. He was ultimately sold to Venezia, following his return.

References

External links
 

1988 births
Living people
Italian footballers
Juventus F.C. players
Hellas Verona F.C. players
Serie B players
Association football defenders